The Blaxnit (Ulster) Tournament was a golf tournament played in Northern Ireland from 1963 to 1967. The event was sponsored by Blaxnit, a local manufacturer of socks and tights.

Winners

References

Golf tournaments in Northern Ireland
Recurring sporting events established in 1963
Recurring events disestablished in 1967